Non-medical masks may refer to:
 cloth face masks
 respirators not intended for medical use (e.g., dust masks)
 daily protective masks similar to surgical masks, but not intended for medical use (e.g., GB/T 32610 standard)